Eucalyptus Hills is a census-designated place in the East County region of San Diego County, California. The 2020 United States census reported Eucalyptus Hills's population as 5,517, up from 5,313 in the 2010 census.

Geography
According to the United States Census Bureau, the CDP covers an area of 4.8 square miles (12.4 km), 99.69% of it land and 0.31% of it water.

Demographics

At the 2010 census Eucalyptus Hills had a population of 5,313. The racial makeup of Eucalyptus Hills was 4,566 (85.9%) White, 195 (3.7%) African American, 58 (1.1%) Native American, 87 (1.6%) Asian, 6 (0.1%) Pacific Islander, 187 (3.5%) from other races, and 214 (4.0%) from two or more races. Hispanic or Latino of any race were 782 people (14.7%).

The census reported that 5,297 people (99.7% of the population) lived in households, 16 (0.3%) lived in non-institutionalized group quarters, and no one was institutionalized.

There were 1,803 households, 731 (40.5%) had children under the age of 18 living in them, 1,164 (64.6%) were opposite-sex married couples living together, 164 (9.1%) had a female householder with no husband present, 102 (5.7%) had a male householder with no wife present.  There were 92 (5.1%) unmarried opposite-sex partnerships, and 17 (0.9%) same-sex married couples or partnerships. 264 households (14.6%) were one person and 130 (7.2%) had someone living alone who was 65 or older. The average household size was 2.94.  There were 1,430 families (79.3% of households); the average family size was 3.24.

The age distribution was 1,381 people (26.0%) under the age of 18, 524 people (9.9%) aged 18 to 24, 1,153 people (21.7%) aged 25 to 44, 1,578 people (29.7%) aged 45 to 64, and 677 people (12.7%) who were 65 or older.  The median age was 37.5 years. For every 100 females, there were 102.7 males.  For every 100 females age 18 and over, there were 99.5 males.

There were 1,900 housing units at an average density of 398.0 per square mile, of the occupied units 1,298 (72.0%) were owner-occupied and 505 (28.0%) were rented. The homeowner vacancy rate was 0.8%; the rental vacancy rate was 6.1%.  3,668 people (69.0% of the population) lived in owner-occupied housing units and 1,629 people (30.7%) lived in rental housing units.

References

Census-designated places in San Diego County, California
Census-designated places in California